Frédéric Vaccari (born 7 November 1987) is a French professional rugby league footballer who plays for the Palau Broncos in the French Elite One Championship. A France international representative , he previously played for Catalans Dragons in the  Super League and for Toulouse Olympique and Villeneuve Leopards in the French Elite One Championship.

He was named in the France training squad for the 2008 Rugby League World Cup.

He represented France in the 2010 European Cup, a pre match before the 2011 Four Nations. 2012 Autumn International Series, 2013 Rugby League World Cup and 2014 European Cup.

References

External links
Team profile
Vaccari joins Dragons
Frederic Vaccari joins Catalans Dragons
GREAT BRITAIN LIONS 42 FRANCE 14

1987 births
Living people
Catalans Dragons players
France national rugby league team players
French rugby league players
Palau Broncos players
People from Villeneuve-sur-Lot
Rugby league wingers
Sportspeople from Lot-et-Garonne